William John Bainbrigge Fletcher (1879-1933) was a British consul at Hoihow (Haikou) and the author of books on Chinese poetry such as Gems of Chinese Verse and More gems of Chinese poetry (1918, reprinted 1933).

References

External links
 

1879 births
1933 deaths
British diplomats
British expatriates in China